Gregor Fisken is a British racing driver and businessman (born 28 September 1964) who currently races historic and modern-day sportscars. He is one of only a handful of racing drivers to have driven in all four classes (LMP1, LMP2, GT1 and GT2) at the famous Le Mans 24 Hours motor race.

Early career 
Fisken began his career as an apprentice mechanic with the famous Scottish restorer and dealer of pre-war motorcars, Bunty Scott-Moncrieff, while also trying his luck at rallycross in old cars he prepared. In the late 1980s Gregor worked in the sales department of Coys of Kensington, an upmarket classic car dealership in a Kensington Mews.

In 1996 Fisken’s passion for classic cars led him to open his dealership, Fiskens Fine Historic Automobiles, in London’s upmarket South Kensington. As of 2014, the business continues to operate successfully, with work currently underway to expand the premises.

Racing success 
With continuing business success, Fisken decided to turn his attention back to racing – both in historic cars and more modern machinery.

In 1998, Fisken managed the feat of winning his class in both the Tour Auto and the Monaco Historic Grand Prix as well as finish a competitive second overall in the British Empire Trophy at Silverstone in a Porsche 962 Group C car. A first foray in modern racing netted Fisken a third in the Silverstone GT race in a McLaren F1 GTR.

Due to a lack of spare time, Fisken was forced to cut back on his racing activities in 1999 and 2000, only being able to compete in one race each year. Success still arrived though, scoring a third in class in the Spa 3 Hours and winning his class for the second time in the Monaco Historic Grand Prix.

For 2001, Fisken competed in the Spa 24 Hours, but was unable to finish due to mechanical failure, in modern racing as well as two other races in classic cars: the Goodwood Revival Meeting Tourist Trophy, which he won with team-mate Emmanuele Pirro, and the Nurburgring 500 km where he won his class on the famous Nordschleife.

2002 saw him return to the Nordschleife for the Nürburgring 24 Hours where he finished third in class in a BMW M3 despite spending over an hour in the pits with mechanical problems.

Work commitments proved too much in 2003, but a return to modern racing in 2004 saw Fisken compete in two iconic races: the Sebring 12 Hours and the Le Mans 24 Hours, both with the GT – Racers Group Porsche GT3 RSR.

Attracted by endurance racing, in 2005 Fisken signed up to the Intersport team for two rounds of the American Le Mans Series (with a best in class result in Portland) and the Le Mans 24 Hours (retired after having led his class), and with Team Jota for two rounds of the Le Mans Series (best result of fifth overall in Istanbul).

Mechanical problems plagued the 2006 season in which the best result possible was a first in class in the Shell Historic Ferrari Challenge and a fourth in the Donington 1000 km driving an LMP1 works Courage.

2007 saw Fisken race for the complete year in the Le Mans Series for Larbre Competition in the Aston Martin DBR9 with a best result being first in class in the Mille Milhas, Interlagos, Brazil. He did, however, manage to make the finish in the Le Mans 24 Hours, with the same car, with a respectable 13th in class. He was also awarded the Scott Moncrieffe award, named after his former employer Bunty, given for sportsmanship and services to historic racing.

In 2008, Fisken experienced the thrill of a lifetime driving the famous Ferrari 330 P3 at Paul Ricard, twice finishing on the podium. An appearance at the Le Mans Classic and Silverstone Classic weekends showed that he had lost none of his passion for old-timers. A return to the American Le Mans Series quickly followed with 19th position overall and fourth in the LMP1 class at Road America with Intersport.

24 Hours of Le Mans results

External links 
 Official Gregor Fisken website

1964 births
Living people
British racing drivers
British GT Championship drivers
British sports businesspeople
American Le Mans Series drivers
European Le Mans Series drivers
24 Hours of Le Mans drivers
24 Hours of Spa drivers
Aston Martin Racing drivers
Larbre Compétition drivers
Jota Sport drivers